The Old Almadén Winery is a historic wine production site in Santa Clara County, California situated on the eastern slopes of the Santa Cruz Mountains. The winery is no longer in operation, the Almaden Vineyards company moved to Madera, California, and the vestigial remains of the property have been made into a public park; much of the prior winery grounds have also been converted to single family residential uses, following a series of environmental planning studies. Established in 1852, the Old Almaden Winery was the oldest winery in California, and the site is designated as a California Historical Landmark.

One of the old remaining heritage trees from the estate is a 72"-diameter California Pepper Tree, previously part of the old mansion grounds on the winery estate.

References
 Wahler Associates,  Investigation of Soil Pesticide Contamination at the Old Almaden Winery, San Jose, California , December 8, 1989
 Earth Metrics Inc,  Old Almaden Winery, San Jose, file reference 10453, January 10, 1990
 Santa Clara County, California, Heritage tree resolution HT-10-013, pertaining to 1891 Blossom Hill Road (2004)
  Encyclopedia of Consumer Brands: Consumable Products , 681 pages, published by the Gale Group, Business & Economics, p 8 (1993)

Notes

External links
Photo of Old Almaden Winery, Santa Cruz Mountains

Geography of Santa Clara County, California
Mountain ranges of Northern California
Wineries in Santa Cruz Mountains